William Lee Antonie (24 February 1764 – 11 September 1815) was an English politician.

He was born William Lee, the son of William Lee, MP for Appleby. His grandfather was Sir William Lee, Chief Justice of the King's Bench. He was educated at Westminster School. In 1771 he inherited Colworth House, near Sharnbrook in Bedfordshire, from a cousin Richard Antonie, after which he added Antonie to his own name. He also inherited Totteridge Park, Buckinghamshire (formerly in Hertfordshire), from his father in 1778, his mother, Philadelphia, continuing to live there.

He was a Member of Parliament (MP) for Great Marlow from 1790 to 1796 and for Bedford from 1802 to 1812.

He died unmarried in 1815. He bequeathed Colworth House to his nephew John Fiott, who assumed the name of Lee under the terms of his uncle's will.

References 
 

1764 births
1815 deaths
High Sheriffs of Bedfordshire
Members of the Parliament of Great Britain for English constituencies
Members of the Parliament of the United Kingdom for English constituencies
British MPs 1790–1796
UK MPs 1802–1806
UK MPs 1806–1807
UK MPs 1807–1812
Lords of the Manor of Totteridge
People from Sharnbrook
Whig (British political party) MPs for English constituencies